Vachellia montana is a species of legume in the family Fabaceae. The Latin specific epithet montana refers to mountains or coming from mountains.

References

montana